North Woolwich is an unincorporated rural community in Woolwich Township, Waterloo, Ontario, Canada.

History
Woolwich Township Public School #9 was located in North Woolwich from 1907 to 1963.

North Woolwich had a post office from 1908 to 1913.

References

Communities in the Regional Municipality of Waterloo
Woolwich, Ontario